The Viana do Castelo District is a district located in the northwest of Portugal, bordered on the north by Spain (Galicia) and on the south by Braga District. The district capital is the city of Viana do Castelo.

Municipalities
The district is composed of ten municipalities:
 Arcos de Valdevez Municipality
 Caminha Municipality
 Melgaço Municipality
 Monção Municipality
 Paredes de Coura Municipality
 Ponte da Barca Municipality
 Ponte de Lima Municipality
 Valença Municipality
 Viana do Castelo Municipality
 Vila Nova de Cerveira Municipality

List of Parliamentary Representatives

Summary of votes and seats won 1976-2022

|- class="unsortable"
!rowspan=2|Parties!!%!!S!!%!!S!!%!!S!!%!!S!!%!!S!!%!!S!!%!!S!!%!!S!!%!!S!!%!!S!!%!!S!!%!!S!!%!!S!!%!!S!!%!!S!!%!!S
|- class="unsortable" align="center"
!colspan=2 | 1976
!colspan=2 | 1979
!colspan=2 | 1980
!colspan=2 | 1983
!colspan=2 | 1985
!colspan=2 | 1987
!colspan=2 | 1991
!colspan=2 | 1995
!colspan=2 | 1999
!colspan=2 | 2002
!colspan=2 | 2005
!colspan=2 | 2009
!colspan=2 | 2011
!colspan=2 | 2015
!colspan=2 | 2019
!colspan=2 | 2022
|-
| align="left"| PS || 25.5 || 2 || 24.9 || 2 || 22.8 || 1 || 32.5 || 2 || 18.4 || 1 || 20.3 || 1 || 25.2 || 2 || 38.8 || 3 || style="background:#FF66FF;"|40.2 || style="background:#FF66FF;"|3 || 35.3 || 3 || style="background:#FF66FF;"|42.0 || style="background:#FF66FF;"|3 || style="background:#FF66FF;"|36.3 || style="background:#FF66FF;"|3 || 26.2 || 2 || 29.8 || 2 || style="background:#FF66FF;"|34.8 || style="background:#FF66FF;"|3 || style="background:#FF66FF;"|42.1 || style="background:#FF66FF;"|3
|-
| align="left"| PSD || style="background:#FF9900;"|32.8 || style="background:#FF9900;"|3 || align=center colspan=4 rowspan=2|In AD || style="background:#FF9900;"|32.6 || style="background:#FF9900;"|3 || style="background:#FF9900;"|33.5 || style="background:#FF9900;"|3 || style="background:#FF9900;"|54.5 || style="background:#FF9900;"|5 || style="background:#FF9900;"|56.9 || style="background:#FF9900;"|4 || style="background:#FF9900;"|42.1 || style="background:#FF9900;"|3 || 35.8 || 2 || style="background:#FF9900;"|45.5 || style="background:#FF9900;"|3 || 33.5 || 2 || 31.3 || 2 || style="background:#FF9900;"|43.6 || style="background:#FF9900;"|3 || align=center colspan=2 rowspan=2|In PàF'' || 33.8 || 3 || 34.2 || 3
|-
| align="left"| CDS-PP || 23.5 || 2 || 18.4 || 1 || 16.6 || 1 || 7.7 ||  || 7.2 ||  || 11.3 ||  || 14.0 || 1 || 10.3 ||  || 11.4 || 1 || 13.6 || 1 || 13.4 || 1 || 6.2 ||  || 3.4 
|-
| align="left"| AD || colspan=2| || style="background:#00FFFF;"|54.8 || style="background:#00FFFF;"|4 || style="background:#00FFFF;"|59.2 || style="background:#00FFFF;"|5 || colspan=26|
|-
| align="left"| PRD || colspan=8| || 16.2 || 1 || 4.8 ||  || colspan=20|
|-
| align="left"| PàF || colspan=26| || style="background:#00AAAA;"|45.5 || style="background:#00AAAA;"|4''' || colspan=4| 
|-
! Total seats || colspan=2|7 || colspan=30|6 
|-
! colspan=33|Source: Comissão Nacional de Eleições
|}

References

 
Districts of Portugal
Wine regions of Portugal